Richard Frank Stika (born July 4, 1957) is an American prelate of the Catholic Church, serving as the third bishop of the Diocese of Knoxville in Tennessee since 2009. He is accused of covering up the rape of a diocesan employee by a seminarian in an ongoing 2022 lawsuit.

Biography

Early life 
Richard Stika was born on July 4, 1957, in St. Louis, Missouri, to Frank and Helen (née Musielak) Stika; his father was of Czech heritage and his mother Polish. The third of four children, he has three brothers, Lawrence, Robert, and Joseph. He was baptized at St. Francis de Sales Church on July 21, 1957, and attended Epiphany of Our Lord School in South St. Louis.

Stika attended St. Augustine Minor Seminary High School in Holland, Michigan, for one year, then entered Bishop DuBourg High School in St. Louis, graduating in 1975. He then studied at St. Louis University, obtaining a Bachelor of Science degree in business in 1979.  Stika then entered Kenrick-Glennon Seminary in Shrewsbury, Missouri, where he earned a Bachelor of Philosophy degree in 1981 and a Master of Divinity degree in 1985. Cardinal John Carberry ordained Stika as a deacon on May 1, 1985.

Priesthood 
Stika was ordained to the priesthood by Archbishop John L. May on December 14, 1985 for the Archdiocese of St. Louis.  After his ordination, Stika served as an associate pastor of Mary Queen of Peace Parish in Webster Groves, Missouri, until 1991. In 1991, He was appointed spiritual director of the Catholic Youth Organization and associate director of the Office of Vocations.  Stika was also transferred to be an associate pastor at St. Paul Parish in Fenton, Missouri (1991–1992) and later at the Cathedral of St. Louis Parish (1992–1994).

From 1994 to 2004, Stika served as chancellor of the archdiocese. During this period, he also served as private secretary and master of ceremonies to Archbishop Justin Rigali (1994–1997), vicar general and vicar for religious (1997–2004), and member of the College of Consultors (1997–2009). Stika was raised by the Vatican o the rank of honorary prelate on June 28, 1995, and coordinated Pope John Paul II's visit to St. Louis in 1999.

Named vicar for priests in 2002, Stika served as both pastor of the Church of the Annunziata Parish in Ladue, Missouri, and episcopal vicar for Child and Youth Protection from 2004 to 2009.

Bishop of Knoxville 
On January 12, 2009, Stika was appointed bishop of the Diocese of Knoxville by Pope Benedict XVI. He received his episcopal consecration on March 19, 2009. from Cardinal Rigali, with Archbishop Joseph Kurtz and Bishop Robert Shaheen serving as co-consecrators, at the Knoxville Convention Center. Stika selected as his episcopal motto:  ("Jesus, I Trust in You").

Possessing bi-ritual faculties, Stika can also celebrate the West Syriac Rite Holy Qurbono according to the recension of the Maronite Church, an Eastern Catholic Church in full communion with the pope. He is also a member of the Knights of Columbus and the Order of the Holy Sepulchre. He is a fan of the St. Louis Cardinals baseball team, and has a cockapoo named Rosie, and two other dogs named Mollie and Stella. He is a close friend of Cardinal Rigali and considered the latter's protégé.

Criticisms of Leadership as Bishop 
In April 2021, a Vatican official from the Congregation for Bishops in Rome stated that the Holy See had received about ten accusations against Stika under the auspices of the Motu proprio Vos estis lux mundi, which were being reviewed. The same official stated it was likely that Archbishop Kurtz would be granted power to investigate.

In 2021, 11 priests of the Diocese of Knoxville, roughly 20 percent of the presbyterate, feeling that they had exhausted all alternative courses of action, wrote to the apostolic nuncio, Archbishop Christophe Pierre, requesting of the Holy See "merciful relief" from Stika's leadership. The letter stated in part that:Our experience of our appointed bishop varies among us, but the undersigned do share a common awareness that the past twelve years of service under Bishop Stika have been, on the whole, detrimental to priestly fraternity and even to our personal well-being.

While we acknowledge the reality of suffering that comes with bearing our daily crosses, our appointed bishop seems determined to increase that suffering for his own purposes, purposes which seem unrelated to the demands of the Gospel.

What we have not attempted to relay to you here by way of example is the lack of sympathy the bishop demonstrates for his priests facing personal trials, or the lack of charity he displays for such priests when he speaks about us to others, even publicly. ... It seems to us that ours is a depressed presbyterate, and has been developing as such for twelve years, due to the leadership of Bishop Stika.

It is precisely in a spirit of total dependence upon the pastoral leadership of the Apostolic See that we make this appeal for merciful relief—in whatever form is judged possible and appropriate—from the sufferings we’ve endured these past twelve years. We have no recourse other than the Holy See.

Cathedral of the Most Sacred Heart 
In September 2014, Stika initiated fundraising to construct a new Cathedral of the Most Sacred Heart of Jesus in Knoxville, He dedicated it on March 3, 2018. Attendees included Cardinals Rigali, Cardinal William Levada, Cardinal Stanisław Dziwisz of Kraków, Poland, Cardinal Daniel DiNardo, Cardinal Timothy M. Dolan, and Archbishop Christophe Pierre, the apostolic nuncio to the United States.

Questions concerning the funding of the cathedral arose in 2021, as diocesan priests and employees alleged that Stika had taken funds from diocesan education and employee benefit funds, including loan money from the Paycheck Protection Program, to pay for the 36 million dollar cathedral. One anonymous priest of the diocese said "we are nearly bankrupt... there's just not going to be cash there."

Handling of clerical sexual abuse 
On April 16, 2010, Stika revoked the ministerial privileges of William Casey, a priest who formerly served in the diocese.  Casey had been accused of rape and sexual abuse by a young altar boy.  When confronted, Casey admitted his crimes to Stika and other diocesan officials. Casey was convicted in July 2011 of first-degree sexual misconduct and two counts of aggravated rape and sentenced to prison.  The Vatican laicized Casey on January 10, 2013.

In 2017 Stika attempted, over the objections of Knoxville priests and psychological experts, to ordain as a priest a transitional deacon of another diocese who had been dismissed from formation because of sexual misconduct allegations. Ultimately the deacon was not ordained because his own bishop refused to excardinate, or transfer, him to the Diocese of Knoxville.

Stika has been accused of "bullying" a woman who reported possible grooming and sexual abuse by a priest of the diocese in 2017.

Anthony D. Punnackal, an Indian priest serving in the diocese, was accused in April 2022 of "one count of sexual battery and one count of sexual battery by an authority figure" during a grief counseling session. The diocese is alleged to have mishandled that claim as well.

Wojciech Sobczuk 
In February 2021 a lawsuit was filed against both Stika and the Diocese of Knoxville which alleged that Wojciech Sobczuk, a Polish seminarian whom Stika had invited to study for the diocese at the recommendation of  Cardinal Dziwisz in 2018, had raped and sexually harassed an organist employed by Sacred Heart Cathedral in February 2019. The lawsuit also claimed that prior to becoming a seminarian for the Diocese of Knoxville Sobczuk had been dismissed from the Jesuits after being accused of sexual misconduct at SS. Cyril and Methodius Seminary in Orchard Lake, Michigan. Additionally, the lawsuit further alleged that Stika had intimidated the 2019 rape victim in an attempt to silence him, accusing the victim of raping Sobczuk. Stika also recommended the two keep in contact via Snapchat, a social media app in which messages disappear after being sent.

Shortly after the alleged rape, Sobczuk was sent to St. Meinrad Seminary in St. Meinrad, Indiana. The seminary dismissed him in March 2021 following new accusations of sexual misconduct. These accusations included groping, tickling, and sending explicit Snapchat messages, and watching a seminarian change clothes through a window. After his dismissal, Sobczuk remained classified as a seminarian of the diocese, which according to Stika was in order to protect his immigration status, a remark which led to public speculation of immigration fraud. Following his dismissal, Sobczuk lived in the episcopal residence, and in September of 2021 accompanied Stika on a 10-day vacation.

In response to the rape allegation against Sobczuk, the diocesan review board appointed as investigator a retired law enforcement officer who was subsequently dismissed by Stika for  "asking all these questions." The investigator appointed by Stika as replacement interviewed only Sobczuk before closing his investigation. Neither the diocese nor the investigator appointed by Stika contacted the seminarians at St. Meinrad who had accused Sobczuk of harassing and assaulting them.

As a seminarian, Sobczuk was the recipient of special treatment from Stika and lived in the bishop's home when not at St. Meinrad. In December of 2019, Stika arranged for Sobczuk to miss over a week of classes at St. Meinrad in order to accompany Stika on his ad limina visit to the Vatican. Additionally, based on diocesan fiscal records, between mid-2018 and 2020 $4,000 of diocesan funds were earmarked as cash gifts for Sobczuk, and the diocese also paid for his phone bill and reimbursed nearly $30,000 of travel, car repairs, and other expenditures. This was in addition to monthly stipends received by Sobczuk which ranged from $600–$1000, three to five times higher than the typical seminarian stipend.

Health 
Stika suffers from type 1 diabetes and uses an insulin pump. He underwent cardiac bypass surgery in 2004 and suffered a major heart attack in 2009, during a visit to South Florida. He had an angioplasty in 2018. He is also blind in his right eye.

See also

 Catholic Church hierarchy
 Catholic Church in the United States
 Historical list of the Catholic bishops of the United States
 List of Catholic bishops of the United States
 Lists of patriarchs, archbishops, and bishops

Notes

References

External links 
 Diocese of Knoxville
 Bishop Richard Frank Stika at Catholic-Hierarchy.org

1957 births
Living people
American people of Czech descent
American people of Polish descent
Kenrick–Glennon Seminary alumni
Roman Catholic Archdiocese of Louisville
Roman Catholic Archdiocese of St. Louis
Roman Catholic Diocese of Knoxville
Saint Louis University alumni
Religious leaders from Kentucky
Religious leaders from Tennessee
Members of the Order of the Holy Sepulchre
21st-century Roman Catholic bishops in the United States
People with type 1 diabetes